The 1996 congressional elections in Michigan was held on November 5, 1996 to determine who would represent the state of Michigan in the United States House of Representatives. Michigan had sixteen seats in the House, apportioned according to the 1990 United States Census. Representatives are elected for two-year terms.

Overview

References

1996 Michigan elections
1996
Michigan